This is a list of Croat Albanians that includes both Croat people of Albanian descent and Albanian immigrants that have resided in Croatia. The list is sorted by the fields or occupations in which the notable individual has maintained the most influence.

For inclusion in this list, each individual must have a Wikipedia article indicating notability and show that they are Albanian and have lived in Croatia.

History and politics
 Giovanni Renesi  –  Albanian military captain and mercenary
 Giacomo Vuxani  –  Albanian-Italian politician
 Božidar Kalmeta –  Croatian politician and member of the centre-right Croatian Democratic Union (HDZ) party
 Nikola Spanić -   Roman Catholic prelate of and nobleman of Korčula
 Valter Flego – Croatian politician, mayor of Buzet and prefect (Župan) of Istria County
 Aleksandar Stipčević - archeologist and historian
 Šime (Simeone) Duka – secretary of Vatican archives
 Ratimir Kalmeta – geographer and linguist
 Đani Maršan (b. 1944) – singer, musician, diplomat and Croatian Consul
 Gjon Gazulli -  Albanian Dominican friar, humanist scholar, and diplomat
 Ivo Perović -  Regent of Yugoslavia for the underage Peter II from 1934 to 194
 Valter Dešpalj – cellist and professor on Academy of Music in Zagreb

Military
 Agim Çeku -  Commander in the Croatian War of Independence in Croatian Army
 Rahim Ademi -  Croatian Army general of Kosovo-Albanian origin
Ivica Matešić Jeremija – writer, military diplomat and holder of the Order of Danica Hrvatska for culture

Musicians
 Šime Dešpalj – composer, music teacher, writer
 Pavle Dešpalj – music conductor and composer, member of HAZU
 Marie Kraja – Albanian opera singer
 Vlado Kalember – Croatian singer
Bepo Matešić – tenor singer
 Valter Dešpalj – cellist and a professor at the Zagreb Academy of Music
 Mladen Grdović – Croatian pop singer
 Ennio Stipčević (b. 1959) - musicologist, member of HAZU

Cinema
 Anita Berisha  – Croatian actress
 Helena Bulaja  – Croatian multimedia artist, director and producer
 Nera Stipičević – Croatian actress

Religious
 Ivan Prenđa -  Roman Catholic archbishop of the Archdiocese of Zadar
 Janko Šimrak  – bishop of the Greek-Catholic Eparchy of Križevci
 Nikola Kekić  – bishop of the Greek-Catholic Eparchy of Križevci

Sport
 Josip Gjergja -  Former Croatian basketball player
 Vilson Džoni -  Former Croatian footballer
 Ardian Kozniku -  Former Croatian footballer
 Kujtim Shala -  Former Croatian footballer
 Besart Abdurahimi -  Croatian-Albanian footballer
 Arijan Ademi – Macedonian professional footballer who plays for GNK Dinamo Zagreb and Macedonian national team
 Toni Domgjoni – Swiss-Croatian footballer who plays for FC Zürich as a midfielder
 Neven Spahija - Croatian professional basketball coach
 Pëllumb Jusufi -  Croatian-Macedonian football player
 Edo Flego – Croatian footballer and football manager 
 Ivan Bulaja – Croatian sailor and sailing trainer
 Zedi Ramadani - Croatian footballer 
 Anas Sharbini - Croatian footballer 
 Ahmad Sharbini - Croatian footballer 
 Hrvoje Macanović – sport journalist
 Agron Preteni - Croatian kick boxer
 Herdi Prenga - Albanian footballer
 Elvir Maloku - Albanian footballer
 Bogdan Cuvaj -  Croatian football manager
 Mario Musa - Croatian professional footballer playing for Dinamo Zagreb
 Tomislav Duka -  Croatian footballer
 Enver Idrizi -  Karateka and former World Champion
 Rok Stipčević -  Croatian professional basketball player
 Agron Rufati - Croatia-born professional footballer
 Elvir Gigolaj - footballer
 Leonard Bisaku - footballer
 Ivan Jakov Džoni - footballer
 Fatjesa Gegollaj - footballer
 Miranda Tatari - Croatian handball player
 Adrijana Lekaj - Kosovan–Croatian professional tennis player
 Jan Palokaj - professional basketball player

Media
 Kruno Krstić  – lexicographer
 Josip Vladović Relja – writer

References

Albanian
Croatian

Albanian
Croatian